Nephila antipodiana, also known as the batik golden web spider, is a species of golden orb-web spider discovered in 1841 by Charles Athanase Walckenaer.  The species is found throughout Australia, China, Indonesia, the Philippines, and Thailand. The spider's silk contains a pyrrolidine alkaloid which serves as a chemical repellent to keep ants away from the spider's web.

References

Araneidae
Spiders of Australia
Spiders of China
Spiders described in 1841